Seabreeze is an  unincorporated community in Chambers County, Texas, United States.

Education
East Chambers Independent School District operates schools in the area.

External links

Unincorporated communities in Chambers County, Texas
Unincorporated communities in Texas